The River Anner is a river in Ireland, flowing through County Tipperary, a tributary of the Suir.

Course
The River Anner rises south of Mullinahone and flows westwards to the north of Knockahunna. It passes under Melbourne Bridge and turns southwards, meeting the Clashawley River in Grangebeg. It passes under the R706 in Milltownbratton and meets the River Moyle. The Anner passes under the Limerick–Rosslare railway line and then the N24 near Twomilebridge, draining into the Suir at Killaloan Lower.

Wildlife

The River Anner is a noted salmon and trout fishery.

Literature

The river is memorialised in a Charles Kickham poem, "She lived beside the Anner at the foot of Slievenamon".

References

See also
Rivers of Ireland

Rivers of County Tipperary